Jaan Tootsen (born 14 October 1975) is an Estonian Estonian film director, screenwriter and film producer.

Tootsen's father is journalist, writer and politician Toivo Tootsen. Since 2000 he has worked at Estonian National Broadcasting. He has been a long-time editor of radio program "Ööülikool". 2012-2016 he was cultural advisor for Estonian president.

Filmography
 1998 "Tappev Tartu" (feature film)	
 2005 "Avasta rikas nurgatagune kosmoses" (documental film; director)
 2006 "Hea uus ilm" (documental film; director)
 2011 "The New World" (documental film; director)
 2013 "Velosoofid"  (documental film; director and producer)
 2016 "Vigala Sass - viimased lindid" (documental film; director)
 2018 "Vello Salo. Igapäevaelu müstika" (documental film; director and producer)
 2020 "Fred Jüssi. Olemise ilu" (documental film; director)

References

Living people
1975 births
Estonian film directors
Estonian film producers
Estonian screenwriters
Tallinn University alumni